Protoribatidae is a family of mites belonging to the order Sarcoptiformes.

Genera:
 Cribrozetes Balogh, 1970
 Perxylobates Hammer, 1972
 Polillozetes Corpuz-Raros, 2009
 Protoribates Berlese, 1908
 Setoxylobates Balogh & Mahunka, 1967
 Sicaxylobates Luxton, 1985
 Transoribates Pérez-Íñigo, 1992
 Trixylobates Balogh & Mahunka, 1978
 Tuxenia Hammer, 1958
 Vilhenabates Balogh, 1963

References

Sarcoptiformes